The 1977 Southern Philippines autonomy plebiscite was a creation plebiscite held on April 17, 1977 in parts of Mindanao and Palawan in the Philippines.

Background
The Philippine national government and the Moro National Liberation Front signed the Tripoli Agreement which was brokered by Libya under Muammar Gaddafi on December 23, 1976 where it was agreed upon that an autonomous region in the southern Philippines would be created. The Philippine government insisted for a plebiscite to be held.

Originally scheduled to be held on February 21, 1977, the plebiscite was delayed to March 17 of the same year. The vote was postponed again to April 17, 1977.

The delay in the implementation caused tensions between the two parties. As compromise, the Gaddafi and special envoy and First Lady Imelda Marcos came up with a proposal for the Philippine government to proclaim an autonomous region already in with a provisional government. On March 25, 1977, a provisional autonomous region known as Southern Philippines covering the areas under the scope of the then-planned plebiscite was declared.

The Moro National Liberation Front urged for a boycott of the plebiscite. But voting was still held.

Participants of the plebiscite voted in favor of autonomy for Western Mindanao (Region IX) and Central Mindanao (Region XII) while a proposal to merge the regions into one autonomous region was rejected.

Scope
The plebiscite covered the following areas:

Southern Tagalog – Region IV
Palawan

Western Mindanao – Region IX
Basilan
Sulu
Tawi-Tawi
Zamboanga del Sur
Zamboanga del Norte
Zamboanga City

Southern Mindanao – Region XI
Davao del Sur (excluding Davao City)
South Cotabato

Central Mindanao – Region XII
Lanao del Sur
Lanao del Norte
Maguindanao
North Cotabato
Sultan Kudarat

Question

Aftermath
Two Regional Autonomous Governments (RAGs) in Western Mindanao and Central Mindanao were established which the MNLF protested since they prefer a single autonomous region. Furthermore voters from outside these regions rejected the inclusion of their localities to these autonomous areas.

References

1977 in the Philippines
Regional plebiscites in the Philippines
1977 referendums
Presidency of Ferdinand Marcos
History of Bangsamoro
Autonomy referendums